FC Khimik Sievierodonetsk was a professional Ukrainian football club. The club was based in Sievierodonetsk, Ukraine.

Brief history
In Soviet times the club participated on the professional level from 1963 when the Ukrainian zone of the Soviet Second League was organized and until 1970 during another reorganization of the Soviet football structure. Then, in 1991 it reentered the professional competition once again right before the dissolution of Soviet Union. In the Ukrainian soccer competitions as well as in the Soviet, the club was called Khimik (chemical scientist). The club for several season was showing good results and was one of the contenders to be promoted to the Ukrainian Premier League, but in 1998 it became defunct. In recent years (2005–08), there is another club from Sievierodonetsk called Blyskavka (Thunder-bolt) that competes on the amateur level.

 
Defunct football clubs in Ukraine
Association football clubs established in 1952
Association football clubs disestablished in 1998
Football clubs in Luhansk Oblast
1952 establishments in Ukraine
1998 disestablishments in Ukraine
Sport in Sievierodonetsk